Cyperus thomsonii is a species of sedge that is endemic to parts of Asia.

The species was first formally described by the botanist Johann Otto Boeckeler in 1870.

See also 
 List of Cyperus species

References 

thomsonii
Taxa named by Johann Otto Boeckeler
Plants described in 1870
Flora of Assam (region)
Flora of Vietnam
Flora of Bangladesh